The 27th Moscow International Film Festival was held from 17 to 26 July 2005. The Golden George was awarded to the Russian film Dreaming of Space directed by Alexei Uchitel.

Jury
 Valentin Chernykh (Russia – Head of the Jury)
 Nicola Piovani (Italy)
 Ulrich Seidl (Austria)
 János Kende (Hungary)
 Viktoriya Tolstoganova (Russia)
 Claire Denis (France)

Films in competition
The following films were selected for the main competition:

Awards
 Golden George: Dreaming of Space by Alexei Uchitel
 Special Jury Prize: Silver George: Frozen Land by Aku Louhimies
 Silver George:
 Best Director: Thomas Vinterberg for Dear Wendy
 Best Actor: Hamid Farrokhnezhad for Left Foot Forward on the Beat
 Best Actress: Vesela Kazakova for Stolen Eyes
 Lifetime Achievement Award: István Szabó
 Silver George for the Best Film of the Perspective competition: How the Garcia Girls Spent Their Summer by Georgina Riedel
 Stanislavsky Award: Jeanne Moreau

References

External links
Moscow International Film Festival: 2005 at Internet Movie Database

2005
2005 film festivals
2005 festivals in Europe
Mos
2005 in Moscow
July 2005 events in Russia